PAN3 poly(A) specific ribonuclease subunit is a protein that in humans is encoded by the PAN3 gene.

References

Further reading